Erased is a 2018 Slovenian drama film written and directed by Miha Mazzini based on his own novel of the same name. 
World premiere was at Tallinn Black Nights Film Festival 2018, 25. November 2018, while Slovenian one was on 25. February 2019.

The story of the film is dealing with the Slovenian erased citizens, almost 2% of the population that remained without a legal status after the declaration of the country's independence in 1991.

Plot
Ana comes to the hospital to give birth. Everything goes well except for a small, bureaucratic problem: she is not in the computer. After a few days, she is entangled in a web of Kafkaesque proportions: not being in the computer means that she has no social security, no permanent address. She is suddenly a "foreigner," officially at least, even though she has spent all of her life in this country. Legally, she doesn't exist. This means that her child is an orphan, and orphans must go up for adoption.

Awards
Miha Mazzini, best screenplay, FEST, Belgrad, 2019
Miha Mazzini best screenplay, Raindance festival, London, 2019
Judita Franković Brdar, best leading actress, Festival os Slovenian film 2018
Judita Franković Brdar, best leading actress in coproduction, 66. Pula film festival, Pula, Croatia, 2019
Judita Franković Brdar, special mention of Federation of film critics of Europe and Mediterannea - FEDEORA, 66. Pula film festival, Pula, Croatia, 2019
Judita Franković Brdar best leading actress, BASTAU IF, Almaty, Kazakhstan, 2019
Sanja Džeba best costumography, Festival slovenskega filma 2018
Jura Ferina, Pavao Miholjević, Vladimír Godár best original music, Festival slovenskega filma 2018
Matjaž Pavlovec, best set design, Festival slovenskega filma 2018

Festivals
San Sebastián International Film Festival 2017, Španija, section Glocal in Progress (unfinished films), September 2017
Festival of Slovenian film 2018, September 2018 (four awards)
world premiere Tallinn Black Nights Film Festival 2018, Estonia, 25. November 2018
Trieste Film Festival 30, 2019, Italy, competition, 21. January 2019
FEST Belgrade, Serbia, 2019, competition, 1. March 2019 (ena nagrada)
Festival International du Film d'Aubagne, France, 2019, competition, 19. March 2019
LICHTER Filmfest Frankfurt International, Germany, Extra Regional program, 30. March 2019
IFF Panamá, Festival Internacional de Cine de Panamá, Panama, 6. - 8. April 2019
The Cleveland International Film Festival, ZDA, East Europe Competition, 3. - 6. April 2019,
Festival tolerancije - JFF Zagreb, Croatia, 13. April 2019
Fajr International Film Festival, Iran, April 2019,
Neisse Filmfestival, Germany - Poland - Czech republic, 12. April 2019
21114 – Film fest, Novi Sad, Serbia, 13. June 2019
Valletta Film Fest Competition, Malta, 14. June 2019
Pula film festival, Croatia, 15. July 2019  (two awards)
Manarat IFF, Tunisia, 1. July 2019
Oostende IFF, Belgium, 6. September 2019
Raindance IFF, Anglija, 26. - 28. September 2019 (one award)
Ravac IFF, Moldovia, 2. October 2019
43ª Mostra internacional de cinema, São Paulo, Brasil, October 2019
Crime & Panishment, Turkey, competition, November 2019
Eastern Neighbours Film Festival, Netherland, 7. November 2019
Zagreb FF, Croatia, 7. November 2019
Balkan Film Festival Ulm, Germany, 8. November 2019
20e Arras Film Festival, France, November 2019
BASTAU IF, Almaty, Kazakhstan, 3. - 7. December 2019 (ena nagrada)
Valjevski filmski susreti, Valjevo, Serbia, 15. December 2019
Balkan Film Festival, Roma, Italy, 8. to 11. October 2020
Gangneung International Film Festival 5-14 Nov. 2020, South Korea (literature and film section)

See also
 List of Slovenian films

References

External links
 

2018 films
2018 drama films
Slovenian drama films